The Bishop Family Lustron House is a historic Lustron house located at 26 Slater Drive in Glenville, Schenectady County, New York.

Description and history 
It was built in November 1949, and measures 31 feet by 35 feet on a poured concrete slab. The exterior is clad with two-foot by two-foot steel panels coated with "Dove Gray" colored porcelain enamel. It is a Westchester Deluxe two-bedroom model home.

It was added to the National Register of Historic Places on March 6, 2008.

References

Houses on the National Register of Historic Places in New York (state)
Houses completed in 1949
Houses in Schenectady County, New York
Lustron houses
National Register of Historic Places in Schenectady County, New York